The periodical Jangal (Persian: جنگل; DMG: Ǧangal; English: "Forest") was founded in 1917 by the Nehzat-e Jangal (“Jangali-movement“, 1914–1921) in Gilan. Mirza Kuchak Khan (1880/1882–December 1921), a young revolutionary and the founder and leader of this movement was fighting together with the Ettehad-e Eslam committee (“Islamic Unity“) in the forests of Northern Iran. Their movement was directed against – among others – large landowners as well as the exertion of influence coming from the British and Tsarist Russia. In June 1920, the Jangalis joined forces with the Communist Party of Iran and proclaimed the Socialist Republic of Gilan, which was re-conquered by Reza Khan Pahlavi (later: Reza Shah Pahlavi) in November 1921. The journal was the mouthpiece of the Jangalis and partially published by Mirza Hoseyn Kasma’i (1862–1921). They spread their opinion and critique in 31 issues by means of literary texts and cultural symbolism. They had many ideas in common with the nationalism of state elites: aspiring the compatibility of Islam, Iranian nationalism and socialism.

References

Further reading
 Kashani-Sabet, Firoozeh (2000): Frontier Fictions: Shaping the Iranian Nation, 1804–1946. I.B. Tauris.
 Shakeri, Khosro (2007): Milade Zakhm: Jonbesh-e Jangal va Jomhuri-ye-ye Shoravi Sozialistischen-e Iran. Akhtaran Presse: Teheran.
 Wahdat-Hagh, Wahied (2003): Die Islamische Republik Iran. Die Herrschaft des politischen Islam als eine Spielart des Totalitarismus. LIT: Münster.

External links
 Ǧangal

1917 establishments in Iran
1918 disestablishments in Iran
Defunct literary magazines
Defunct magazines published in Iran
Defunct political magazines
Magazines established in 1917
Magazines disestablished in 1918
Persian-language magazines
Literary magazines published in Iran